Archaeological excavations discovered this colonnade with pointed arches north of the Maiden Tower in 1964. The monument is surrounded by balconies and arches with columns, reminiscent of Mecca. Archaeologists discovered 52 graves, some of which had been used twice. This provides clear evidence that the monument dates back to antiquity. This place has been used as a sacred burial place called ‘Khanaka’ for thousands of years.

Currently the monument houses an open air museum which presents objects related to the period of idolatry, as well as the Albanian and Islamic periods. These represents idols, tombs in the shape of stone sculptures of rams, steles and tombstones with artistic stone carvings. It is a monument of national importance.

References

Museums in Baku
History museums in Azerbaijan